American Ninja Challenge was a nationwide competition sponsored by G4 TV to send a number of American citizens to Japan to compete in the TBS hit TV show Sasuke (known as Ninja Warrior in US). American Ninja Challenge has been held since Sasuke 19 (the 19th competition) and currently merged into the TV series American Ninja Warrior that premiered on December 12, 2009 and succeeded American Ninja Challenge.

Episodes

Ninja Fest (2006)

G4's Attack of the Show hosts Kevin Pereira and Olivia Munn broadcast a competition to ninja aspirees everywhere to create a video displaying their 'ninja moves'. Hundreds of people sent in submissions, and three finalists were selected. Through various competitions in America, the two winners were chosen; Collin Bell from Washington and Brett Sims from South Carolina went to Japan. They then participated in the Ninja Warrior Sasuke tournament.

Ninja Fest 2 (2007)

Once the videos were sent in, six finalists were chosen. The six finalists were: Russelis Perry aka "Blackie Chan") from Colorado Springs, Colorado; martial artist Joe Simonsen from West Islip, New York; Freerunner Brian Orosco from San Francisco, California; Rick Seedman from New York City, New York; freerunner Levi Meeuwenburg from Ann Arbor, Michigan; and Mark Witmer from Minneapolis, Minnesota.

These six finalists then went to a US Navy training camp, where they competed on a marine training obstacle course. In '1v1' challenges, three of the six competitors were eliminated. Once there were three challengers left, they competed on an improvised course consisting of several of the new Ninja Warrior's most difficult obstacles.

The winner, Levi Meeuwenberg, cleared it in 45 seconds, followed by Brian Orosco at 1:12 and Russelis Perry in third place at 1:16. In Japan the two top finalists Levi and Brian were joined by former finalist Brett Sims to take on the course at Midoriyama.

Trip to Japan

Levi and Brian, prior to leaving for Japan, met with U.S. Olympic athlete and Ninja Warrior competitor Paul Terek, who has reached the third stage in past Ninja Warrior competitions. Paul trained them in strategies and tactics to quickly and successfully defeat some of the trickier obstacles of Ninja Warrior. Afterward, they headed to Japan, where they enjoyed Japanese culture and met for a dinner with Ninja Warrior's all-stars, including Makoto Nagano, the winner of the 17th Ninja Warrior tournament. Some other all-stars they met were: Shingo Yamamoto, gas station manager, and firefighter Toshihiro Takeda, who has reached the third stage more than any other competitor.

Ninja Fest 3 (2008)
The third American Ninja Challenge contest by G4 wrapped up in August 2008, and aired as part of November 12, 2008. Viewers got to vote for their favorite competitors and the top three would be picked and flown directly to Japan to compete in Sasuke 21. The three winners were Brian Orosco (who qualified with a different video), gymnast Mark Witmer of Minneapolis, Minnesota, and freerunner/stuntwoman Luci Romberg (the first woman to qualify) of Valley Village, California. These winners joined American Ninja Challenge 2 winner Levi Meeuwenberg and both hosts from Attack of the Show!, Olivia Munn and Kevin Pereira to compete. In Japan, they have the ultimate experience, along with training at Muscle Park, a scaled-down version of the Sasuke course located in a section of shopping mall called "Muscule Park".

Ninja Fest 4 (2009)
The fourth and final Ninja Challenge contest winner was David Campbell. He joined up with former Ninja Challenge winners Luci Romberg and Levi Meeuwenberg to compete in Sasuke 22. Also joining them was the returning host Olivia Munn for the run to the top of mount Midoriyama. This season concluded the American Ninja Challenge, which subsequently evolved into its own national format - American Ninja Warrior.  Beginning with the 4th season of American Ninja Warrior, the qualifiers would compete on a replicated Sasuke Midoriyama course in the Las Vegas, USA (and no longer participate in the Japanese version of the show). Beginning with ANW5, additional "Special" competitions would also be arranged between the finalists of the Japanese and USA editions of the show.

Notable contestant results at Sasuke (Ninja Warrior)

Hosts and announcers for G4

American Ninja Warrior

The popularity of the American Ninja Challenge led G4 to create a licensed version of Sasuke titled American Ninja Warrior, with contestants from the United States and all play-by-play commentary in English.

See also

 American Ninja Warrior (USA)
 Team Ninja Warrior (USA)
 Sasuke - Japan
 Kunoichi (Women's version of Sasuke) - Japan
 Kinniku Banzuke (known in the U.S. as Unbeatable Banzuke) - Japan
 Viking: The Ultimate Obstacle Course - Japan
 Pilgrim Films & Television

External links
 Ninja Warrior on G4
 Levi Meeuwenberg Website of Ninja Warrior Levi Meeuwenberg

Competitions
2000s American game shows
2007 American television series debuts
2009 American television series endings
Challenge
Ninja Warrior (franchise)
Sasuke (TV series)